The Buffalo Creek Reservation was a tract of land surrounding Buffalo Creek in the central portion of Erie County, New York.

History
The territory around Buffalo Creek was conquered by the Seneca in the 1600s from the Wenrohronon, also called Wenro. Sometime between 1660 and 1690 the Seneca began to occupy the area. This was during the period of the Beaver Wars, when the Iroquois nations worked to expand their territory and hunting grounds.

During the American Revolution, the Sullivan Expedition of 1779 destroyed many towns of the Seneca, as they were allies of the British.  The homeless people fled to the protection of the British at Fort Niagara. At one point the British were reported to be feeding and housing over 5000 refugees. Following a terrible winter of 1779–80 at Niagara, the Iroquois began to disperse. Joseph Brant took a group of mixed tribal members to the Grand River in Canada, where the Crown promised them a large grant of land.

The Tuscarora went to Lewiston. The remaining Seneca, Cayugas, and Onondaga peoples, led by Sayenqueraghta (Old King) and his son-in-law Roland Montour, chose to settle at Buffalo Creek.

Because the Seneca had been allies of the defeated British, the US forced them to cede most of their territory. By the Treaty of Big Tree in 1797, the Seneca relinquished all of Western New York except for twelve reservations, including Buffalo Creek. This reservation encompassed much of the present site of the city of Buffalo, New York, as well as its southern and western suburbs. By 1817 an estimate placed the population on the reservation at around 700 Seneca, plus small numbers of other displaced people.

In 1838 the United States forced the Seneca to agree to the Treaty of Buffalo Creek, which was part of the Indian Removal policy initiated by President Andrew Jackson's administration. It required the Seneca of western New York to cede all of their reservation lands and move west of the Mississippi River, specifically to Wisconsin and Indian Territory (present-day Oklahoma), within five years. After the land sale that required the treaty fell through, the US negotiated a new treaty, which the Senate ratified in 1842. The Seneca began selling portions of the reservation in the 1840s to European Americans, members of the Ebenezer Society.

The Buffalo Creek reservation was the only reservation to be dissolved: the Seneca were allowed to keep their Cattaraugus, Oil Springs, Allegany and Tonawanda reservations after legal battles in the 1850s fought by Onondaga chief Samuel George and other leaders.

Current status
The modern Buffalo Creek Reservation consists of a nine-acre plot of land, which was part of the original reservation. In 2010, the Seneca bought the land from Carl Paladino, whose Ellicott Development Company continues to own much of the surrounding land. The Seneca developed the Seneca Buffalo Creek Casino on this property, the revenues of which are used for economic development. A branch of its "Seneca One Stop" convenience store chain is being erected on the plot in 2020, with plans to open it in 2021.

References 

American Indian reservations in New York (state)
Geography of Buffalo, New York
Former American Indian reservations
Seneca tribe